North Vancouver is a federal electoral district in the province of British Columbia, Canada, that has been represented in the House of Commons of Canada since 1988.

Demographics

According to the Canada 2016 Census; 2013 representation

Languages: 69.8% English, 7.7% Persian, 2.2% Tagalog, 2.1% Mandarin, 1.9% Korean, 1.8% French, 1.6% Spanish, 1.6% German, 1.5% Cantonese
Religions (2011): 47.2% Christian (18.2% Catholic, 7.0% Anglican, 6.6% United Church, 1.6% Lutheran, 1.5% Presbyterian, 1.4% Christian Orthodox, 1.3% Baptist 9.6% Other), 6.3% Muslim, 42.5% No religion 
Median income (2010): $39,040 
Average income (2010): $58,194

Geography
This district includes the entirety of the City of North Vancouver and the majority of the District of North Vancouver.

History
This riding was created in 1987 from portions of North Vancouver—Burnaby and Capilano electoral districts.

The 2012 federal electoral boundaries redistribution concluded that the electoral boundaries of North Vancouver should be adjusted, and a modified electoral district of the same name will be contested in future elections. The redefined North Vancouver loses the eastern portion of its current territory to the new district of Burnaby North—Seymour, while its western boundary with West Vancouver—Sunshine Coast—Sea to Sky Country is adjusted to correspond to the boundaries between the District of North Vancouver, West Vancouver and the Capilano Indian Reserve. These new boundaries were legally defined in the 2013 representation order, which came into effect upon the call of the 42nd Canadian federal election, scheduled for October 2015.

Members of Parliament

This riding has elected the following Members of Parliament:

Members of Parliament
North Vancouver, as well as surrounding North Shore ridings, typically elect right-leaning candidates in federal elections. For nearly 25 consecutive years between 1979 and 2004, North Vancouver and its predecessor, North Vancouver-Burnaby, were held by a member of the major "small-c" conservative party of the day. The stream was however interrupted in the 2004 general election, when outgoing North Vancouver (city) mayor Don Bell was able to swing the riding over to the Liberals, just narrowly defeating long-time incumbent Conservative MP Ted White. Bell was re-elected in the 2006 election (by less than 4% of the vote), though in neither of his two terms did the sitting parliament even make it to the halfway point of its five-year mandate before an election was held. In the 2008 election, North Vancouver businessman Andrew Saxton returned the riding to the Conservatives, winning a plurality of the vote (by less than 5% of the vote) and defeating the incumbent Don Bell. Saxton served as parliamentary secretary to multiple cabinet ministers in the Conservative majority government, including Parliamentary Secretary to the Minister of Finance (Jim Flaherty). In the 2015 general election, amidst a climate of growing dissatisfaction with the government and Prime Minister Stephen Harper, as well as the emergence of populous strategic voting, Liberal candidate Jonathan Wilkinson defeated Saxton by almost a 2-to-1 margin, and serves as parliamentary secretary to the minister of environment and climate change in the Liberal majority government in Canada's 43rd parliament.

Election results

See also
 List of Canadian federal electoral districts
 Past Canadian electoral districts

References

 Library of Parliament Riding Profile
 Campaign expense data from Elections Canada - 2008
 Expenditures - 2004
 Expenditures - 2000
 Expenditures - 1997

Notes

External links
 Website of the Parliament of Canada
 North Vancouver riding profile at CBC News
 Politwitter
 Project Democracy
 Pundit's Guide
 StatsCan District Profile

British Columbia federal electoral districts
Federal electoral districts in Greater Vancouver and the Fraser Valley
North Vancouver (city)
North Vancouver (district municipality)